Tux Typing is a free and open source typing tutor created especially for children. It features several different types of game play, at a variety of difficulty levels. It is designed to be fun and to improve words per minute speed of typists.

It is written in the C programming language and is available in the repositories of some Linux distributions such as Fedora.

Interface 
There is a practice mode for learning basics of typing. There are also two games. In the first, fish are falling from the sky, each fish has a letter or a word written on it. When the player presses the corresponding key, or types the appropriate word, Tux will position himself to eat the fish.  The second game is similar, but the goal is to prevent comets from falling on a city, when a comet lands on the city, the shield will be removed, then if it is hit again without the shield, it disappears. If it is hit by a comet while the city is destroyed, points will be deducted. In both games, different languages can be selected as a source for the words.

See also 
 Tux, of Math Command
 Tux Paint
 GCompris

References 

Notes
 Tina Gasperson (September 8, 2008) ''Three typing tutors and a boy, linux.com

External links 
 Official website
 Tux Typing at GitHub

Software for children
Typing software
Linux games
Open-source video games
Free educational software
GNOME Kids
Touch typing tutors for Linux
Free software that uses SDL
Software that uses Cairo (graphics)
Typing video games